Kalow or Kalu is a village in Bamyan Province in central Afghanistan. It is located close to the border with Maidan Wardak Province.

See also
Bamyan Province

References

External links 
Satellite map at Maplandia.com 

Populated places in Bamyan Province